= Campo do Lenheiro =

- Full name: Campo do Lenheiro
- Location: São Paulo, Brazil
- Owner: Corinthians
- Operator: Corinthians
- Surface: grass

Construction
- Opened: 1910

Tenant
- Corinthians

Campo do Lenheiro was Corinthians' first football field, in São Paulo, Brazil.

== History ==
The first Corinthians' stadium was not actually a stadium. The team played on a field, owned by a wood seller, and because of that, known as Campo do Lenheiro (Portuguese for Wood Seller's Field).
